Georgia most commonly refers to:

 Georgia (country), a country in the Caucasus region of Eurasia
 Georgia (U.S. state), a state in the Southeast United States

Georgia may also refer to:

Places

Historical states and entities
 Related to the country in the Caucasus
 Kingdom of Georgia, a medieval kingdom
 Georgia within the Russian Empire
 Democratic Republic of Georgia, established following the Russian Revolution
 Georgian Soviet Socialist Republic, a constituent of the Soviet Union
 Related to the US state
 Province of Georgia, one of the thirteen American colonies established by Great Britain in what became the United States
 Georgia in the American Civil War, the State of Georgia within the Confederate States of America

Other places
 359 Georgia, an asteroid 
 New Georgia, Solomon Islands
 South Georgia and the South Sandwich Islands

Canada
 Georgia Street, in Vancouver, British Columbia, Canada
 Strait of Georgia, British Columbia, Canada

United Kingdom
 Georgia, Cornwall, England, UK
 South Georgia Island, a British island in the South Atlantic Ocean

United States
 Georgia, Indiana
 Georgia, Nebraska, an unincorporated community
 Georgia, New Jersey
 Georgia, Vermont
 Georgia Avenue, Washington, DC

People
 Georgia (name), a female given name 
Georgia (musician) (born 1990), English singer, songwriter, and drummer

Media and entertainment

Film and television
 Georgia (1988 film), an Australian thriller
 Georgia (1995 film), an American drama
 State of Georgia (TV series), a 2011 American sitcom

Albums
Georgia, by Georgia, 2015
Georgia (EP), by Brian Fallon, or the title song, 2016
Georgia, the second part of Macon, Georgia by Jason Aldean, 2022

Songs
 "Georgia", by Boz Scaggs from Silk Degrees, 1976
 "Georgia", by Elton John from A Single Man, 1978
 "Georgia", by Orchestral Manoeuvres in the Dark from Architecture & Morality, 1981
 "Georgia" (Carolyn Dawn Johnson song), 2000
 "Georgia" (Field Mob and Ludacris song), 2005
 "Georgia", by Hanson from The Walk, 2007
 "Georgia" (Cee Lo Green song), 2010
 "Georgia" (Vance Joy song), 2014
 "Georgia", by Phoebe Bridgers from Stranger in the Alps, 2017
 "Georgia", by Brittany Howard from Jaime, 2019
 "Georgia on My Mind", written by Hoagy Carmichael, 1930; official song of the American state of Georgia

Ships 
 CSS Georgia (ironclad), floating battery, commissioned 1863
 CSS Georgia (steamship), merchantman, commissioned 1863
 , a Union Navy gunboat steamer of the American Civil War
 USS Georgia (BB-15), battleship, commissioned 1906
 SS Georgia, oil tanker, commissioned 1908
 USS Georgia (SSGN-729), submarine, commissioned 1984

Universities 
 University of Georgia, in Athens, Georgia, United States
 Georgia Bulldogs, the athletic teams of the University of Georgia
 University of Georgia (Tbilisi), in Tbilisi, Georgia

Other uses 
 Georgia (coffee), a brand of coffee beverages (often flavored) sold by The Coca-Cola Company
 Georgia (typeface), a Microsoft font family
 Georgia-Pacific, an American pulp and paper company 
 "Georgia", a national sports team for the country of Georgia, see 
 Georgia national football team
 Typhoon Georgia (1959)

See also 

 State of Georgia (disambiguation)
 Georgia state (disambiguation)
 
 
 George (disambiguation)
 Georgian (disambiguation)
 Giorgia (disambiguation)